Agnes von Konow (5 March 1868 - 15 May 1944), was a Finnish activist for the protection of animals. She was the founder of the Finnish society for the protection of animals, SEY Suomen Eläinsuojeluyhdistysten liitto, and a pioneer within the animal protection movement in Finland.

Life
Agnes von Konow was born to the official noble Oskar Wilhelm von Konow and Amalia Sofia Malmström. She studied at the Svenska fruntimmersskolan i Helsingfors and the Jyväskylä seminary and became a school teacher in Helsinki in 1895. In 1901, she founded the SEY Suomen Eläinsuojeluyhdistysten liitto; in 1918-23 she served in the Suomen Punaisen Tähden and in 1918-24 in the Suomen Yhtyneiden; she was the secretary of the Sylvia-yhdistyksen from 1909, and from 1928 to her death chairperson of the Animal Protection Society.

References

  kansallisbiografia Suomen kansallisbiografia  (National Biography of Finland)

1868 births
1944 deaths
19th-century Finnish nobility
19th-century Finnish women
Place of birth missing
Animal welfare workers
20th-century Finnish nobility
20th-century Finnish women